Reponen is a Finnish surname. Notable people with the surname include:

 Eemeli Reponen (born 1990), Finnish footballer and coach
 Milka Reponen (born 1991), Finnish orienteering competitor

Finnish-language surnames